The 2018 Big East men's soccer tournament, was the sixth men's soccer tournament of the new Big East Conference, formed in July 2013 after the original Big East Conference split into two leagues along football lines. Including the history of the original conference, it was the 23rd edition of the Big East tournament.

Georgetown repeated as champions, to earn their second-ever Big East soccer title, and their eighth overall NCAA Tournament berth. The Hoyas were the only Big East team to earn a berth into the NCAA Tournament, which they were seeded 13th in the tournament. In the tournament, the Hoyas knocked off Mid-American Conference regular season Champions, West Virginia.

Seeds

Bracket

Results

First round

Semifinals

Final

Statistics

Goals

Assists

All Tournament Team 
 Tournament Offensive MVP: Ethan Lochner, Georgetown
 Tournament Defensive MVP: Brendan McDonough, Georgetown

All-Tournament team:

 Achara, Georgetown
 Ethan Lochner, Georgetown
 Brendan McDonough, Georgetown
 Kyle Zajec, Georgetown
 Luis Barraza, Marquette
 Luka Prpa, Marquette

 Patrick Seagrist, Marquette
 Joel Rydstrand, Creighton
 Akeem Ward, Creighton
 Brendan Constantine, Providence
 João Serrano, Providence

References

External links 
 Big East Men's Soccer Tournament

Big East Conference Men's Soccer Tournament
Big East Men's Soccer
Big East Men's Soccer
Big East Men's Soccer
Big East Men's Soccer